The mixed single vote (MSV) or positive vote transfer system (PVT) is a mixed-member electoral system, where voters cast a single vote in an election, which used both for electing a local candidate and as a vote for a party affiliated with that candidate according to the rules of the electoral system. Unlike the more widespread mixed proportional and mixed majoritarian systems (such as parallel voting) where voters cast two votes, split-ticket voting is either not possible or not allowed in MSV. 

Voters usually cast their single vote for a local candidate in a single-member district (SMD) and then all the wasted votes from this lower tier are added to distribute seats between upper tier candidates, typically national party lists. How proportional the outcome is depends on many factors including the of vote transfer rules, such which votes are recounted as party list votes, and other parameters (e.g. the number of list seats) used in the system. The MSV system originates from Germany and is currently used in Hungary for local elections in larger municipalities. It was used for the Italian Senate from 1993 to 2005.

Electoral systems using mixed single vote 
Mixed single vote systems may use vote linkage compensation, meaning not all, but only "wasted" votes get transferred as list votes to the other tier. Some uncommon, supermixed systems use of MSV may add or subtract the discounted list results to establish a vote linkage based element of compensation into system that would otherwise be categorised as parallel voting. (This article focuses primarily on pure implementations of MSV.)

They may also use seat linkage compensation, which means almost all votes (except for votes independent candidates and for candidates affiliated with parties below a threshold) are transferred to the proportional tier but used in a top-up process, like the additional member system (AMS). This was the first type of mixed-member proportional (MMP) electoral system, used in Germany.

The third type of mixed single vote system is the single vote equivalent of parallel voting, which uses the same vote on both the majoritarian and proportional tiers. This makes such systems non-compensatory, falling under the superposition type of mixed systems identified by Massicotte&Blais.

Use

Compensatory systems

Semi-proportional systems 
Hungary: Local elections in municipalities and districts in the capital with a population over 10 000 use a mixed single vote with positive vote transfer, where only votes for losing candidates are transferred to the compensatory tier. The vote transfer takes place based on the party affiliation of the local candidates and seats are allocated proportionally based on the transferred votes.
 Up to 25 000 residents 8 members are elected in SMDs and 3 members on the compensatory tier
 Up to 50 000 residents 10 members are elected in SMDs and 4 members on the compensatory tier
 Up to 75 000 residents 12 members are elected in SMDs and 5 members on the compensatory tier
 Up to 100 000 residents 14 members are elected in SMDs and 6 members on the compensatory tier
 Over 100 000 residents, the number of SMDs increases by 1 after every additional 10 000 residents, while the number of compensatory seats increases by 1 after every additional 25 000 residents.
Since the 2014 elections, General Assembly of Budapest also uses a mixed single vote, in that the 23 directly elected mayors of the districts and there are 9 members elected from compensation-lists of parties based on the votes cast for the mayoral candidates. (Budapest mayor candidates and district mayor candidates can be listed on compensation-lists)

Because of the comparatively few compensatory seats, the system does not guarantee proportional results and commonly underrepresents smaller parties, however theoretically, it could also underrepresent larger parties compared to a list PR system.

National Assembly elections use a different positive vote transfer system, which also partially compensates winning candidates, however, that system is not a pure mixed single vote system as it also has a parallel voting component.

Proportional systems 

Mixed single vote systems can be used also with a seat linkage method to achieve effectively list PR with local representation (via plurality or majority). Such systems are fundamentally mixed-member proportional systems without the option of split ticket voting. This is the original version of MMP, where all votes, except for those in favour of independent candidates or parties below the entry threshold are transferred and used for the compensation mechanism. Germany, where the 1949 elections were held under a mixed single vote system that used plurality rule on the lower tier and was overall proportional on the regional (state) tier. The country subsequently changed the system to two-vote MMP.

Countries that currently use such systems are:

 Bolivia adopted single vote MMP in 1994. The seat allocation is based on the vote for president, which is why this system is sometimes called double simultaneous vote (DSV).
 Lesotho switched to a mixed single vote version of MMP in 2002.
 Thailand has used the mixed single vote version of MMP since the 2019 general election, however the next election is scheduled to again be held under parallel voting.

In Romania, the 2008 national legislative elections were held under a mixed single vote system where SMD seats were only awarded to individual winners with an absolute majority.

Non-compensatory systems

Italy

See also 
 Additional member system
 Scorporo or negative vote transfer systems
 Semi-proportional representation
Double simultaneous vote (DSV), is a related system, in which a single vote is used for multiple separate elections at the same time (for an assembly and a president), not a single, mixed election
 List of electoral systems by country

References 

Electoral systems
Mixed electoral systems
Semi-proportional electoral systems
Proportional representation electoral systems